College of Agriculture ( – Honorestān Keshāvarzī) is a college and village in Abnama Rural District, in the Central District of Rudan County, Hormozgan Province, Iran. At the 2006 census, its population was 891, in 194 families.

References 

Populated places in Rudan County
Universities in Iran
Buildings and structures in Hormozgan Province
Education in Hormozgan Province